Presidents of the American Chemical Society:

 John W. Draper (1876)
 J. Lawrence Smith (1877)
 Samuel William Johnson (1878)
 T. Sterry Hunt (1879)
 Frederick A. Genth (1880)
 Charles F. Chandler (1881)
 John W. Mallet (1882)
 James C. Booth (1883)
 Albert B. Prescott (1886)
 Charles Anthony Goessmann (1887)
 T. Sterry Hunt (1888)
 Charles F. Chandler (1889)
 Henry B. Nason (1890)
 George F. Barker (1891)
 George C. Caldwell (1892)
 Harvey W. Wiley (1893)
 Edgar Fahs Smith (1895)
 Charles B. Dudley (1896)
 Charles E. Munroe (1898)
 Edward W. Morley (1899)
 William McMurtrie (1900)
 Frank W. Clarke (1901)
 Ira Remsen (1902)
 John H. Long (1903)
 Arthur Amos Noyes (1904)
 Francis P. Venable (1905)
 William F. Hillebrand (1906)
 Marston T. Bogert (1907)
 Willis R. Whitney (1909)
 Wilder D. Bancroft (1910)
 Alexander Smith (1911)
 Arthur D. Little (1912)
 Theodore W. Richards (1914)
 Charles H. Herty (1915)
 Julius Stieglitz (1917)
 William H. Nichols (1918)
 William A. Noyes (1920)
 Edgar Fahs Smith (1921)
 Edward C. Franklin (1923)
 Leo H. Baekeland (1924)
 James Flack Norris (1925)
 George D. Rosengarten (1927)
 Samuel W. Parr (1928)
 Irving Langmuir (1929)
 William McPherson (1930)
 Moses Gomberg (1931)
 Lawrence V. Redman (1932)
 Arthur B. Lamb (1933)
 Charles L. Reese (1934)
 Roger Adams (1935)
 Edward Bartow (1936)
 Edward R. Weidlein (1937)
 Frank C. Whitmore (1938)
 Charles A. Kraus (1939)
 Samuel C. Lind (1940)
 William Lloyd Evans (1941)
 Harry N. Holmes (1942)
 Per K. Frolich (1943)
 Thomas Midgley, Jr. (1944)
 Carl S. Marvel (1945)
 Bradley Dewey (1946)
 W. Albert Noyes, Jr. (1947)
 Charles A. Thomas (1948)
 Linus Pauling (1949)
 Ernest H. Volwiler (1950)
 N. Howell Funnan (1951)
 Edgar C. Britton (1952)
 Farrington Daniels (1953)
 Harry L. Fisher (1954)
 Joel H. Hildebrand (1955)
 John C. Warner (1956)
 Roger J. Williams (1957)
 Clifford F. Rassweiler (1958)
 John C. Bailar, Jr. (1959)
 Albert L. Elder (1960)
 Arthur C. Cope (1961)
 Karl Folkers (1962)
 Henry Eyring (1963)
 Maurice H. Arveson (1964)
 Charles C. Price (1965)
 William J. Sparks (1966)
 Charles G. Overberger (1967)
 Robert W. Cairns (1968)
 Wallace R. Brode (1969)
 Byron Riegel (1970)
 Melvin Calvin (1971)
 Max Tishler (1972)
 Alan C. Nixon (1973)
 Bernard S. Friedman (1974)
 William J. Bailey (1975)
 Glenn T. Seaborg (1976)
 Henry A. Hill (1977)
 Anna J. Harrison (1978)
 Gardner W. Stacy (1979)
 James D. D'Ianni (1980)
 Albert C. Zettlemoyer (1981)
 Robert W. Parry (1982)
 Fred Basolo (1983)
 Warren D. Niederhauser (1984)
 Ellis K. Fields (1985)
 George C. Pimentel (1986)
 Mary L. Good (1987)
 Gordon L. Nelson (1988)
 Clayton F. Callis (1989)
 Paul G. Gassman (1990)
 S. Allen Heininger (1991)
 Ernest L. Eliel (1992)
 Helen M. Free (1993)
 Ned D. Heindel (1994)
 Brian M. Rushton (1995)
 Ronald Breslow (1996)
 Paul S. Anderson (1997)
 Paul H.L. Walter (1998)
 Edel Wasserman (1999)
 Daryle H. Busch (2000)
 Attila E. Pavlath (2001)
 Eli M. Pearce (2002)
 Elsa Reichmanis (2003)
 Charles P. Casey (2004)
 William F. Carroll, Jr. (2005)
 Elizabeth Ann Nalley (2006)
 Catherine T. Hunt (2007)
 Bruce E. Bursten (2008)
 Thomas H. Lane (2009) 
 Joseph Francisco (2010) 
 Nancy B. Jackson (2011)
 Bassam Z. Shakhashiri (2012)
 Marinda Li Wu (2013)
 Thomas J. Barton (2014)
 Diane Grob Schmidt (2015)
 Donna J. Nelson (2016)
 Allison A. Campbell (2017)
 Peter K. Dorhout (2018)
 Bonnie A. Charpentier (2019)
 Luis Echegoyen (2020)
 H.N. Cheng (2021)
 Angela K. Wilson (2022)

References

 
American Chemical Society
American Chemical Society